Beyla is a prefecture located in the Nzérékoré Region of Guinea. The capital is Beyla. The prefecture covers an area of 13,612 km.² and has an estimated population of 326,082.

Sub-prefectures
The prefecture is divided administratively into 14 sub-prefectures:
 Beyla-Centre
 Boola
 Diara-Guerela
 Diassodou
 Fouala
 Gbakedou
 Gbessoba
 Karala
 Koumandou
 Moussadou
 Nionsomoridou
 Samana
 Sinko
 Sokourala

References

Prefectures of Guinea
Nzérékoré Region